Neudorf is a village and a former municipality in the district of Harz, in Saxony-Anhalt, Germany. Since 1 September 2010, it is part of the town Harzgerode.

History 
The village was established in 1530/31 in the district (Amt) of Bärenrode by the counts of Stolberg, but soon thereafter was transferred to the princes of Anhalt-Bernburg. The first village houses were erected on the present day Church Square (Kirchplatz). Farm workers were the first to settle here. They soon built a small church and, in 1542, received the first Evangelical priest. The Thirty Years' War devastated the peaceful village.
 
In 1806 there were 58 houses with 370 inhabitants who lived off farming, cattle breeding, coal transportation and woodcutting. Neudorf developed into a mineworkers' village (the best-known ore mines were the Meiseberg and Pfaffenberg pits). In 1887 the present brick church was built. A workers' hostel was built for the many craftsmen hired for the mines.

Neudorf im Harz was known its mining and the mineral specimens of great beauty that were discovered here and which had become much sought after collectors' items by the 19th century (including specimens containing galenite, siderite, quartz, zinc blend and bournonite crystals). Specimens from this period may be viewed e.g. in the Zincken Collection in Bernburg Castle.

Following the closure of the pits, tourism sprang up as a new source of income.
The spring of Stahlquelle ("Steel Spring") was made accessible to visitors in 1931 and contributed to Neudorf's good reputation as a tourist destination.

On 1 September 2010 Neudorf was incorporated into Harzgerode.

Tourism 
There is a checkpoint (no. 193) for hikers by the Stahlquelle which is part of the Harzer Wandernadel system.

References

Former municipalities in Saxony-Anhalt
Harzgerode
Duchy of Anhalt